Bolt-action rifles are an evolution of the lever-action rifle, offering greater accuracy and stronger receivers. Bolt actions require the user to manually cycle the bolt after each round is fired, and are usually loaded with stripper clips.

Other firearm lists 
 List of weapons
 List of firearms
 List of rifles
 List of machine guns
 List of submachine guns
 List of assault rifles
 List of battle rifles
 List of semi-automatic rifles
 List of carbines
 List of straight-pull rifles
 List of pump-action rifles
 List of multiple-barrel firearms
 List of pistols
 List of semi-automatic pistols
 List of revolvers
 List of sniper rifles
 List of shotguns

References

Bolt-action rifles